Matthew Boyce Bacon (born 13 April 1993) is a New Zealand cricketer who plays for Otago. He was born at Auckland in 1993.

Bacon made his first-class debut in February 2016 in the 2015–16 Plunket Shield for Wellington against Otago. After making three appearances during the season for Wellington, he moved to Otago ahead of the 2017/18 season and made his Twenty20 debut for Otago in the 2017–18 Super Smash in January 2018 and his List A debut in the 2017–18 Ford Trophy on 31 January 2018. In June 2018, he was awarded a contract with Otago for the 2018–19 season and in June 2020 was offered a contract by Otago ahead of the 2020–21 domestic cricket season.

References

External links
 

1993 births
Living people
New Zealand cricketers
Otago cricketers
Wellington cricketers
Cricketers from Auckland